Rubellimicrobium aerolatum is a Gram-negative, strictly aerobic and non-spore-forming bacterium from the genus of Rubellimicrobium which has been isolated from air from Suwon in Korea.

References 

Rhodobacteraceae
Bacteria described in 2009